On 26 October 2006, a CASA C-212 Aviocar aircraft of the Swedish Coast Guard crashed into the Falsterbo Canal, Sweden.

Accident 
The accident aircraft was performing a low-level fly-by of the Skanör-Falsterbo Coast Guard Station while en route from Ronneby Airport to Malmö Airport.

The accident was observed by a group of schoolchildren who reported that the port wing fell off during a turn, making the aircraft fall into the sea. All four crewmembers died.  The wreckage was subsequently recovered.

The Swedish Coast Guard grounded its remaining fleet of CASA C-212s within days after the accident. The remaining aircraft were sold to Uruguay.

Cause 
The Swedish Accident Investigation Board determined the cause to be metal fatigue. The Swedish Coast Guard later replaced the aircraft with Bombardier Dash-8 Q300s because the remaining two aircraft were found to have the same issue.

Notes 

Accidents and incidents involving military aircraft
Aviation accidents and incidents in 2006
Accidents and incidents involving the CASA C-212 Aviocar
Aviation accidents and incidents in Sweden
October 2006 events in Europe
2006 in Sweden
21st century in Skåne County